Spain is set to participate in the Eurovision Song Contest 2023 in Liverpool, United Kingdom, with the song "Eaea" performed by Blanca Paloma. The Spanish broadcaster  (RTVE), together with the Generalitat Valenciana, organised Benidorm Fest in order to select the Spanish entry for the 2023 contest. 18 entries were selected to compete in the national final, which consists of three shows: two semi-finals and a final. Eight entries ultimately qualified to compete in the final on 4 February 2023, and the winner was determined by a combination of votes from an expert jury, a demoscopic panel and a televote.

As part of the "Big Five", Spain directly qualified to compete in the final of the Eurovision Song Contest.

Background 

In , Spain placed third with the song "" performed by Chanel.

The Spanish national broadcaster,  (TVE), broadcasts the event within Spain and organises the selection process for the nation's entry. TVE confirmed their intentions to participate at the 2023 Eurovision Song Contest on 18 June 2022. Spain has selected their entry for the Eurovision Song Contest through both national finals and internal selections in the past.

Before Eurovision

Benidorm Fest 2023 

Eighteen artists and songs competed over three shows: two semi-finals on 31 January and 2 February 2023 and the final on 4 February 2023.

The semi-finals were broadcast on two nights of the same week, and the voting consisted of voting system consisted the televote (50%), a demoscopic panel of judges made up of a sample of the Spanish population selected by statistical and demoscopic criteria (25%), and a national and international jury vote (50%). Nine acts competed in each semifinal, with the top four advancing to the final.

Semi-finals 
 The first semi-final took place on 31 January 2023. "" performed by Agoney, "" performed by Alice Wonder, "" performed by Fusa Nocta and "" performed by Megara advanced to the final, while "" performed by Aritz, "" performed by Sharonne, "" performed by Meler, "Sayonara" performed by Twin Melody and "" performed by Sofía Martín were eliminated.
 The second semi-final took place on 2 February 2023. "" performed by Blanca Paloma, "" performed by Vicco, "" performed by Karmento and "" performed by José Otero advanced to the final, while "" performed by Alfred García, "" performed by Siderland, "" performed by Famous, "Uff!" performed by E'Femme and "" performed by Rakky Ripper were eliminated.

Final 
The final took place on 4 February 2023 and consisted of the eight entries that qualified from the two preceding semi-finals.

At Eurovision 
According to Eurovision rules, all nations with the exceptions of the host country and the "Big Five" (France, Germany, Italy, Spain and the United Kingdom) are required to qualify from one of two semi-finals in order to compete for the final; the top ten countries from each semi-final progress to the final. As a member of the "Big Five", Spain automatically qualified to compete in the final on 13 May 2023. In addition to its participation in the final, Spain was also required to broadcast and vote in one of the two semi-finals. This was decided via a draw held during the semi-final allocation draw on 31 January 2023, when it was announced that Spain would be voting in the first semi-final.

References

External links
 Official TVE Eurovision website

2023
Countries in the Eurovision Song Contest 2023
Eurovision
Eurovision